Pembroke is a home rule-class city in Christian County, Kentucky, in the United States. The population was 869 as of the 2010 U.S. Census. It is part of the Clarksville, Tennessee metropolitan area.

History
The town was settled in 1836 and named for Pembroke Somerset, Esq., a character in Jane Porter's 1803 novel Thaddeus of Warsaw, by Dr. Lunsford Lindsay, a local store owner. It was incorporated as a city in 1869.

Geography
Pembroke is located in eastern Christian County at  (36.774633, -87.356361). U.S. Route 41 passes through the town as Nashville Street, leading northwest  to Hopkinsville, the county seat, and southeast  to Guthrie at the Tennessee border.

Demographics

As of the census of 2000, there were 797 people, 305 households, and 214 families residing in the city. The racial makeup of the city was 64.87% White, 31.12% African American, 0.50% Native American or Alaska Native, 0.25% Asian, 0.75% from other races, and 2.51% from two or more races. Hispanics or Latinos of any race were 1.25% of the population.

There were 305 households, out of which 36.1% had children under the age of 18 living with them, 48.2% were married couples living together, 18.4% had a female householder with no husband present, and 29.8% were non-families. 26.2% of all households were made up of individuals, and 11.5% had someone living alone who was 65 years of age or older. The average household size was 2.45 and the average family size was 2.95.

The age distribution was 25.7% under the age of 18, 10.4% from 18 to 24, 24.8% from 25 to 44, 20.5% from 45 to 64, and 18.6% who were 65 years of age or older. The median age was 37 years. For every 100 females, there were 81.5 males. For every 100 females age 18 and over, there were 72.1 males.

The median income for a household in the city was $27,143, and the median income for a family was $30,568. Males had a median income of $28,250 versus $18,194 for females. The per capita income for the city was $13,663. About 20.5% of families and 24.0% of the population were below the poverty line, including 32.1% of those under age 18 and 21.4% of those age 65 or over.

See also
 Other places named Pembroke

References

External links

Populated places established in 1836
Cities in Christian County, Kentucky
Cities in Kentucky
Clarksville metropolitan area
1836 establishments in Kentucky